The New Zealand cricket team toured the United Arab Emirates from 11 November to 19 December 2014 to play Pakistan. The tour consisted of three Test matches, two Twenty20 Internationals and five One Day International matches. The Test and T20I series were both drawn 1–1 and New Zealand won the ODI series 3–2.

Squads

Tour match

3-Day Warm-up: Pakistan A vs New Zealanders

Test series

1st Test

2nd Test

3rd Test

T20I series

1st T20I

2nd T20I

ODI series

1st ODI

2nd ODI

3rd ODI

4th ODI

5th ODI

References

External links
 Series home

2014 in New Zealand cricket
2014 in Pakistani cricket
2014–15
International cricket competitions in 2014–15
New Zealand 2014
November 2014 sports events in Asia
December 2014 sports events in Asia